Remoxipride (Roxiam) is an atypical antipsychotic (although according to some sources it is a typical antipsychotic) which was previously used in Europe for the treatment of schizophrenia and acute mania but was withdrawn due to toxicity concerns (incidence of aplastic anemia in 1/10,000 patients). It was initially launched by AstraZeneca in 1990 and suspension of its use began in 1993. Remoxipride acts as a selective D2 and D3 receptor antagonist and also has high affinity for the sigma receptor, possibly playing a role in its atypical neuroleptic action.

Due to its short half-life twice daily (bid) dosing is required, although a once-daily controlled-release tablet has been developed. There was some interest in its use in the treatment of treatment-resistant schizophrenia.

See also 
 Typical antipsychotic
 Benzamide

References

External links 
 Herbert Y. Meltzer, Atypical Antipsychotic Drugs, 2000

Atypical antipsychotics
Benzamides
Organobromides
Phenol ethers
Pyrrolidines
Withdrawn drugs